Robert Eden Scott (April 23, 1808 – May 3, 1862) was a prominent Virginia planter, lawyer and politician who served many terms in the Virginia General Assembly. He also represented Fauquier County at the Virginia Secession Convention of 1861 and the surrounding district in the Provisional Confederate Congress, until his death at the hands of Union Army deserters while defending his farm.

Early and family life
Born in Fauquier County, Virginia in 1808 to "Judge" John Scott and his wife Elizabeth Pickett, Robert Eden Scott was the grandson of Episcopal priest Rev. John Scott, who supported independence in the American Revolutionary War. Robert E. Scott survived three wives. On March 10, 1831, he married Elizabeth Taylor, daughter of Alexandria lawyer Robert L. Taylor. Their son R. Taylor Scott like his father would become a Virginia lawyer and served in the Virginia House of Delegates.

Career
Scott, a prominent Whig served many times as one of two delegates representing Fauquier County (part-time) in the Virginia House of Delegates, winning election and re-election from 1835–1842 and again from 1845–1852. He was also a delegate to the state constitutional convention of 1850–1851 and the Virginia Secession Convention of 1861, changing his vote between April 4 and 17th to support secession. By 1860, Scott owned 34 slaves, about half children under 15 years of age. Scott also represented the state in the Provisional Confederate Congress from 1861 to 1862.  

The autobiography of noted abolitionist Moncure D. Conway (1904) mentions the prominent planter. Conway recalls Scott's pre-Civil War political orientation, "The Hon. Robert E. Scott charmed me by his fine personality and manners, but he was the leading Whig." Conway admired Scott for opposing the "fire eaters" as well as for publicly predicting that secession would end in ruin.

Despite not personally fighting for the Confederacy, Scott was killed by Union deserters when he confronted them for abusing his land.

His son R. Taylor Scott, likewise became a Virginia lawyer, serving in the Confederate army during the Civil War and later as Attorney General of Virginia.

References

1808 births
1862 deaths
Deputies and delegates to the Provisional Congress of the Confederate States
19th-century American politicians
Members of the Virginia House of Delegates
People of Virginia in the American Civil War
United States politicians killed during the Civil War
People from Warrenton, Virginia